Wallace Island Marine Provincial Park is a provincial park in the Gulf Islands of British Columbia, Canada. The park includes almost all  of Wallace Island. Land on the northern side of Princess Cove extending north towards Chivers is private. There are a few hiking trails, and camping is permitted in designated areas.

Conover Cove, on the western side, and Princess Cove, slightly north of Conover on the western side, are the two anchorages used by pleasure boaters. Conover Cove has a small dock which can accommodate shallow-draft vessels. The island is accessible by private boat. There is no public ferry service.

Panther Point, at the south end, has dangerous rocky reefs which extend well past the island. Following the local tradition of naming hazardous reefs after the ships that found them, Panther Point is named after the Panther, a merchant coal-carrier, which ran aground there in 1874, carrying a full load of coal from Nanaimo. Divers still visit what remains of the ship.

Between 1947 and the mid-1960s the island was developed as a vacation resort. One cabin remains standing and intact, and the remains of a few other guest cabins are still present. David Conover wrote a book, Once Upon an Island, which describes this period of the Island's history. Conover continued the tale in One Man's Island and Sitting on a Salt Spring.

The increasing popularity of the island has attracted tourists and animals alike. Within the last decade there has been a bear and a cougar scare.

The island was named for Captain Wallace Houston of HMS Trincomalee who served in the area in 1853.

See also 
Once Upon an Island by David Conover.  Publisher: San Juan Publishing (November 2003)

References

External links
BC Parks, Wallace Island

Provincial Parks of the Gulf Islands
Provincial parks of British Columbia
Marine parks of Canada